Sheryn Mae Poncardas Regis (born November 26, 1980) is a Filipino pop singer-songwriter, host, entrepreneur and occasional actress. She rose to fame during the first season of the singing competition Search for the Star in a Million (formerly Star in a Million) where she placed runner-up to Erik Santos in 2003.

After the competition, Regis became known for singing theme songs from TV series on ABS-CBN including Marina, Krystala, Kampanerang Kuba, Gulong ng Palad, Maria Flordeluna and Prinsesa ng Banyera. She has released four studio albums under Star Records and was a member of ABS-CBN's Star Magic roster of artists.

Early and personal life
Sheryn was born in Carcar, Cebu, to Bernardo and Daisy Regis. She is the eldest of three children, with brothers Elton and Joseph. Sheryn's mother guided her in singing, and at the age of two, she was able to hum and sing simple tunes. Her first and favorite contest piece was Kuh Ledesma's "Dito Ba?" ("Is it Here?") which she learned at age 5. At seven, Regis started joining amateur singing contests. Her winnings were used to buy Shirley Bassey's cassette tapes for her next contest piece. She won her first grand prize at age 8 after singing Tillie Moreno's "Saan Ako Nagkamali" ("Where Did I Go Wrong").

Aside from singing in contests, Sheryn earned income by offering voice lessons to children while in high school. She finished her B.S. Secondary Education degree with a major in English at Cebu Normal University. It was during her college years that she was exposed to theater acting and chorale singing which eventually gave her the chance to travel and perform for Filipino communities in Canada and in the USA. Veteran actors Leo Martinez and Gina Alajar served as her workshop mentors. In 1999, she was awarded "Best Interpreter" at the Cebu Metro Pop Music Festival (a songwriting festival), when she sang "Among Gabayan" (Our Guide), a Cebuano tribute song to Cebu's patron Sto. Niño written by Fr. Jed Ponce Billones. Their entry was also hailed as the Grand Prize winner.

Sheryn worked as a lounge singer at the Cebu Plaza Hotel where she met Earl Echiverri (cousin of Caloocan mayor Enrico Echiverri). They married in 2002 and had their first child Lourdes the following year.

Regis came out as a lesbian in 2021, revealing her relationship with her partner Mel De Guia on social media.

Career

Early career and Star in a Million
Regis first appeared in the "Sing-Eat" segment of Eat Bulaga! in 2002 where she became a grand finalist.

In 2003, Regis secured a place as grand finalist in ABS-CBN’s television reality singing competition Star in a Million after advancing from the elimination rounds with Teresa Garcia. Dubbed as the "Power Belter" because of her effortless high notes, Regis was a judge favorite and was the only finalist to never place in the bottom two during the entire season. She placed consistently in the top performances every week, eventually reaching the Grand Champion Night on January 3, 2004, with Marinel Santos and Erik Santos. Regis won the Texter's Choice Award but placed only as a runner-up after singing Wendy Moten's Come in Out of the Rain. Disheartened by not winning the 1-million peso and house and lot prizes, Regis returned to Cebu thinking she would have to start over again, but was instead offered a recording contract with Star Records and released a recording of Come in Out of the Rain, which became an instant hit and Regis' signature song.

After Star in a Million
In 2004, Regis was chosen by songwriter Vehnee Saturno to represent the Philippines in Voice of Asia in Kazakhstan where she sang "Isang Lahi", "Sana'y 'Di Pangarap", "Now More Than Ever" and Saturno's original song "Follow your Dream". She became the third Filipino to win the 2 Prize Silver Trophy after Jed Madela and Arnee Hidalgo. Upon returning, Regis was given a title, Crystal Voice of Asia by the local media, a common tradition among Filipino singers.

She hosted in noontime show Masayang Tanghali Bayan/MTB Ang Saya Saya and M.R.S. (Most Requested Show).

She had her first concert, "Higher Note," at the Music Museum, followed by several concerts in the Philippines and abroad.

She has also performed together with fellow singers Sarah Geronimo, Erik Santos, Rachelle Ann Go, Frenchie Dy, Jerome Sala, Mark Bautista, and Christian Bautista, and has garnered fame in the Philippines, and internationally, as part of the group dubbed "The Champions."

Sheryn and her husband Earl Echiverri migrated to the United States with their child in 2010 and settled in Houston, Texas.

Albums

Come in Out of the Rain
Even before its album's release, "Come In Out of the Rain" became a radio hit in the Philippines. It stayed for 12 consecutive weeks as number one on Myx OPM Countdown. Regis also released other singles like Maybe (cover version of Peabo Bryson and Regina Belle) and Kailan Kaya, written by Raul Mitra and Cacai Velasquez which served as theme song of ABS-CBN's primetime fantaserye Marina.

In May 2004, Regis officially launched her debut album under Star Records entitled Come In Out of the Rain, produced by Jonathan Manahan. The album included her previous pieces Follow Your Dream and Among Gabayan.

What I Do Best
Regis was awarded by the 21st Year-Ender Excellence Awards as Top Entertainer International Achievement Awardee and Best Female Performer in Asia Pacific and highly nominated in the 18th Awit Awards. She was also nominated in four other categories for her debut album, Best Inspirational Song ("Follow Your Dream"), Best Regional Recording ("Among Gabayan"), Best Song Written for Movie/TV/Stage Play ("Kailan Kaya") and Best Concert Performer in an Intimate Venue Female.

In July 2005, Sheryn launched her second album, "What I Do Best".

She also sang Sabihin Mo Sa Akin, the theme from Kampanerang Kuba.

After the success of her carrier single, she launched her second single by late 2005, Hindi Ko Kayang Iwan Ka. It was chosen as the 'love theme song' of ABS-CBN's television series, Gulong ng Palad. Aside from this, her love song, Sa Piling Mo was aired as a wedding song on the same show.

By April 2006, she released the last single from her second album, Dahil Nagmamahal and was chosen as a theme song of Bernadette Sembrano's Nagmamahal, Kapamilya.

Two songs from this album received recognition. The carrier single, What I do Best, won as Best Song Performed by a Female Artist given by iFM Pinoy Music Awards. Hindi Ko Kayang Iwan Ka, which is actually the most popular song from this album received a prestigious award. It was named by S Magazine as song of the year. At that time, she was dubbed the Crystal Voice of Asia, a title contested by the camp of another Filipino singer Mari Nallos, who held the title much earlier when she was under contract with Star Records.

What I do Best received Gold Record Award by PARI.

The Modern Jukebox Collection
In October 2006, Sheryn began recording for her third album under Star Records. The album was set to release on November 20, 2006. Her first single off the album was a cover of a Leah Navarro original, Ang Pag-Ibig Kong Ito.

Sheryn's remake of Joey Albert's I Remember the Boy was chosen as Jasmine's Theme Song for ABS-CBN's teleserye featuring Kim Chiu and Gerald Anderson, Sana Maulit Muli. She also sang the theme song of the primetime teleserye, Maria Flordeluna topbilled by Eliza Pineda. She also revived the popular Kuh Ledesma hit Dito Ba from the Hit Afternoon Drama Prinsesa ng Banyera which served as the theme song.

She later launched her second official single from the album, a song penned by Ricky Sanchez, Ang Lahat Para Sa 'Yo (later used as a theme song for El Cuerpo), while her self-composition, Pusong Lito, enjoyed frequent airplay in provincial radio stations and was able to reach the Number 1 spot in the MOR Top Hits of MOR Cebu 97.1 Lupig Sila. It was chosen as the theme song of ABS-CBN TV-3 Cebu's Visayan drama series Summer Sunshine, aired during summer season.

Early 2008, Sheryn released her third and final single from the album, Sayang na Sayang, a cover of the Manilyn Reynes original. By end of February, the music video for the single was shot with her Love Spell costar and Be Bench finalist, John James Uy, as the leading man.

Starting Over Again
During the release of her third single from her jukebox album, Sheryn started hinting the public of an upcoming fourth album with a tentative June release. It was also during the planning stages of her fourth album that Sheryn became part of Star Magic, the talent management arm of her mother station, ABS-CBN.

The album, aptly titled Starting Over Again, released its first single bearing the same title, which is based on the Natalie Cole version (the song was originally sung by Dionne Warwick with different lyrics), during the final week of May. The album contains seven revivals and three originals. Sheryn, along with her husband, penned an English original, My Heart Beats for You. Anabelle Regalado, managing director of Star Records, also contributed a Tagalog original, Sana Nandito Ka. Vehnee Saturno, who is also one of the composers on the album with his song Patunayan Mo, was also its producer. This is the first time that one of Sheryn's albums was produced by somebody other than producer Jonathan Manalo.

The carrier of her fourth album was chosen as an official theme song of Korean drama, Three Dads with One Mommy.

Media appearances
Sheryn has the become part of different variety shows, Most Requested Show and ASAP.

Sheryn hosted the now-defunct Search for the Star in a Million Season 2 with fellow champs Erik, Rachelle Ann, and Mark. She is also the host of Little Big Star Cebu, which was reportedly ranked as the fourth top-rating show in Nationwide Charts.

In October 2007, Sheryn was given her first major dual acting role as a fairy godmother and an evil witch who are twin sisters in Love Spell'''s Cindyrella, starring Kim Chiu and Gerald Anderson. Sheryn expressed her excitement as she is given the opportunity to dabble into acting and use her past experience in theater. The series ran through early January 2008.

Early 2008, Sheryn Regis was chosen to be part of the cast of Utoy with Dolphy and Makisig Morales as main stars. However, the teleserye was not aired due to unknown reason.

On June of the same year, she was reported to be part of the final cast of I Love Betty La Fea, ABS-CBN's remake of Betty La Fea, which stars Bea Alonzo on the lead role. Sheryn played the role of Kylie in the series.

When Sheryn came back in the Philippines in January 2013, she appeared in Bandila under the segment Ikaw Na! of Boy Abunda. Further, she became a consistent guest singer in the TV5 variety show, Wowowillie. It was also in 2013 when Sheryn released a digital single entitled "Sinungaling Mong Puso" which was composed by Mr. Vehnee Saturno.

In January 2014, she again visited the Philippines. Sheryn was invited as guest to several TV shows like Sunday All Stars, Unang Hirit and Banana Nite and as a guest judge in It's Showtime. In her interview in Umagang Kay Ganda, she mentioned that she will only stay up to May.

Live performances
In November 2004, Sheryn became part of Viva Concerts' Pinoy Idols: Battle of the Popstars which was held at the Araneta Coliseum. Along with her was Raymond Manalo, Christian Bautista, Mark Bautista, Rachelle Ann Go, Frenchie Dy and Sarah Geronimo. In her solo performance, she performed a medley of her hits, Kailan Kaya, Maybe and Come In Out of the Rain. It was said that the concert was sold out.

In May 2008, she was part of Erik Santos' US Tour. John Prats, Liza Manalo, Denise Laurel, and Pooh were also guests in the concert.

Sheryn as well as Pinoy Dream Academy Season 2 winner Laarni Lozada became part of Ronnie Liang's concert, My Ballad, My Music where it was reported that Ronnie's talent fee will proceed to the Aeta people in Angeles City. It was held November 2009 the Metro Bar.

Sheryn was also invited as a guest performer in Rachelle Ann Go's send-off concert in February 2014. Rachelle together with Sheryn and Jimmy Marquez sang Lady Marmalade. Other guests include Mark Bautista, Christian Bautista, Erik Santos and Regine Velasquez.

In celebration of Solaire Resort & Casino's first anniversary, A Celebration with the Champions was held in March 2014. Sheryn was part of the concert together with Mark Bautista, fellow Star in a Million contestants Erik Santos and Christian Bautista, The Voice of the Philippines finalists Morissette and Klarisse de Guzman, and finally American Idol (season 11) finalists Jessica Sanchez and Hollie Cavanagh. Sheryn sang a medley of her hits during her solo performance. Moreover, she was part of a trio performance along with Klarisse and Morissette.

In April 2014, she had a concert in Al Nasr Leisureland, Dubai with the Star Power grand champion, Angeline Quinto. The concert is named as "A Night with the Ultimate Divas" which was produced by Prolife Events: Concert Producers & Promoters and was presented by Power Horse Energy Drink.

In celebration of Mother's Day, Sheryn as well as Jon "Prince of Broadway" Joven had a concert entitled "A Mother's Day to Remember: Concert of World Class Performers" at the Pacific Star Resort & Spa, May 9, 2014.

In June 2014, PLDT US Mobility sponsored a concert for Filipinos in California entitled Freedom Concert Tour as part of the 116th Philippine Independence Day. Part of the concert was Sheryn as well as other Filipino artists and celebrities namely Marian Rivera, Ogie Alcasid, Regine Velasquez, Alden Richards, Jonalyn Viray, Sheryn Regis, Allan K, Giselle Sanchez and Jannelle So. Part of the proceeds were donated for the relief and rehabilitation efforts of the Philippine Disaster Recovery Foundation.

 Artistry 
 Music and voice 
Sheryn's music is generally pop and ballad and sings more songs mostly about love and heartbreak with low to high notes. She also sing RnB, Pop rock/Rock, Acoustic, Adult Contemporary/soul. Sheryn's voice is premier versatile where she can shift into high to low notes and can sing all genres. Her voice is classified as lyric/dramatic coloratura soprano.

 Influence 
Sheryn has cited Whitney Houston as her major influence and she grew up singing Houston Hits. She also cited Regine Velasquez and Lea Salonga as her musical influence in the Philippines. Some of her musical influence are Mariah Carey, Michael Jackson, Celine Dion, Aretha Franklin, Beyoncé, Kuh Ledesma, Lani Misalucha, and Jaya.

 Philanthropy and other venture 
Sheryn launched The Little Voice Foundation during Sheryn's birthday concert on November 26, 2005, at the SM Megamall Cinema 10. It aims is to provide education to poor children between 5–12.She also engaged in clothing line business which located in different malls in the Philippines. Some of earnings were put on her business.

2020
In 2020, Sheryn took on a new challenge by collaborating with the rock band Hey Moonshine.  They recorded and released a single entitled "Ilang Beses" under Viva Records.  This was the first time Sheryn recorded a song in this genre.

Media soundtracks/Theme songs
Sheryn is also prominently known for singing a lot of themesongs for ABS-CBN teleseryes.

 Now that I Have You – Now that I Have You Theme Song (with Erik Santos)
 Silver Swan – Silver Swan commercial
 Sabay Tayo Pilipinas – Station ID of ABS-CBN Regional Group
 Star Circle Quest – Star Circle Quest Theme Song (with Marinel Santos)
 Nginiiig! – Nginiiig! Theme Song (with Gloc 9)
 Kailan Kaya – Marina Theme Song
 Among Gabayan – Sinulog Festival
 Sabihin Mo Sa Akin – Kampanerang Kuba Theme Song
 Hindi Ko Kayang Iwan Ka – Gulong ng Palad Love Theme Song
 Sa Piling Mo – Gulong ng Palad Wedding Theme Song
 Dahil Nagmamahal – Nagmamahal, Kapamilya Theme Song
 Ang Pag-ibig Kong Ito – Your Song (Zanjoe Marudo and Nikki Gil) later Temptation of Wife Theme Song
 I Remember The Boy – Sana Maulit Muli (Jasmine and Travis) Theme Song
 Maria Flordeluna – Maria Flordeluna Theme Song
 Krystala – Krystala Theme Song
 Shoo Bee Doo Wop – Krystala Love Theme Song
 Pusong Lito – Summer Sunshine Theme Song
 Kailangan Ko’y Ikaw – Maging Sino Ka Man: Ang Pagbabalik Soundtrack
 Dito Ba – Prinsesa ng Banyera Theme Song
 Ang Lahat Para Sa ‘Yo – El Cuerpo del Deseo
 Sayang Na Sayang – Your Song (Matt Evans and Melissa Ricks) Theme Song
 Starting Over Again – Three Dads with One Mommy Theme Song
 Always – Nasaan Ka Maruja? Soundtrack
 Eden Cheese Jingle'' – Eden Cheese commercial

Albums' sales

Studio albums

Collaborations albums

Awards and nominations

See also
 Anggun ("Voice of Asia")

References

External links

 

1980 births
Visayan people
Filipino women pop singers
Filipino television actresses
Participants in Philippine reality television series
Star Magic
Living people
People from Carcar
Singers from Cebu
Musicians from Houston
Star Music artists
21st-century Filipino singers
21st-century Filipino women singers
Filipino LGBT singers
21st-century LGBT people
Lesbian musicians
Lesbian actresses